Marcin Staniek (born July 28, 1980 in Wodzisław Śląski) is a Polish retired footballer.

Career

Club
In February 2011, he moved to Kolejarz Stróże on a half year deal.

In July 2011, joined Olimpia Elbląg on a one-year contract.

References

External links
 

1980 births
Living people
Polish footballers
Flota Świnoujście players
Odra Wodzisław Śląski players
GKS Jastrzębie players
Kolejarz Stróże players
Olimpia Elbląg players
Olimpia Grudziądz players
People from Wodzisław Śląski
Sportspeople from Silesian Voivodeship
Association football defenders